Lue or LUE may refer to:

People
 Andrew Lue (born 1992), Canadian retired football player
 Cachet Lue (born 1997), Canadian-born Jamaican footballer
 Lue Gim Gong (1860–1925), Chinese-American horticulturalist
 Lee Lue (1935–1969), Laotian Hmong fighter-bomber pilot
 Linlyn Lue, Canadian actress
 Robert Lue (1964–2020), Jamaican-born American researcher and academic
 Rufin Lué (born 1968), Ivorian footballer
 Tyronn Lue (born 1977), American professional basketball player
 Wang Lüe (born 1985), Chinese footballer 
 Tai Lue people, one of the 56 recognized ethnic groups of China

Places
 Lue, New South Wales, a small town in Australia
 Lue railway station
 Lüe, a commune in Nouvelle-Aquitaine, France
 Lue (Colunga), a parish in northern Spain

Other uses
 Han Lue, a fictional character in the Fast & Furious franchise
 Life, the Universe and Everything, a book by Douglas Adams
 LUE, IATA airport code for Lučenec Airport

See also
 Donald De Lue (1897–1988), American sculptor